Swami Aseemanand (born Naba Kumar Sarkar) is an Indian Hindu renunciate and Hindu nationalist activist who was accused of masterminding the Ajmer Dargah bombing, Mecca Masjid blast, and the 2007 Samjhauta Express bombings— before being acquitted of all charges.

Aseemanand hailed from West Bengal and was a post-graduate in physics. He was inducted into Rashtriya Swayamsevak Sangh, a Hindu organisation at an early age, and then joined Vanavasi Kalyan Ashram

After being arrested by the Central Bureau of Investigation, on cues from a primary suspect he recorded a confession, in which he admitted to committing the attacks. He was subsequently charged by the NIA; Aseemanand alleged custodial pressure behind the confessions and rejected any involvement. NIA Special court accepted his claim, and went on to rule that the prosecutors had failed to prove their case, otherwise.

In February 2014, a controversy erupted over interviews given by Swami Aseemanand to an advocate-reporter of The Caravan magazine while in Ambala Central Jail. Aseemanand claimed the contents of the interview to be faked which were based on a sting-operation and threatened legal action; the magazine rejected the charges and allegedly release  transcripts of the interviews.

Early life
Aseemanand was born Naba Kumar Sarkar in Kamarpukar located in the Hooghly district of West Bengal. (Over time he also used the aliases Jiten Chatterjee and Omkarnath.) His father was Bibhutibhushan Sarkar, a noted freedom fighter, and his mother is Pramila Sarkar. He is one of seven brothers.

His early life was influenced by Ramakrishna and his world-renowned disciple Swami Vivekananda. As a student he was inducted into the Rashtriya Swayamsevak Sangh (RSS). A graduate in physics, he did his post-graduation from the University of Burdwan, at which time his association with the RSS got stronger. He went on to work for the RSS full-time as a pracharak in 1977 with the Sangh Parivar organisation Vanavasi Kalyan Ashram (VKA), which works for tribal welfare. 
His name Aseemanand was courtesy his guru, Swami Parmanand, in whose ashram in Bangramanjeshwar of Bardhaman Aseemanand stayed till 1988.

Activities in the Dangs district 
In 1993, he came to the headquarters of VKA in Jaspurnagar in Chhattisgarh. After two years, Aseemanand was sent to Dangs district of Gujarat to work with tribals in the area. Local tribals told him that Shabari, from the Ramayana, had lived in their forests, which influenced Swami Aseemanand to build a Shabari temple there. He was quite popular among Dang tribals. When Vanavasi Kalyan Ashram shunted him out of Dang over some controversy, the tribals refused to cooperate and he had to be brought back to placate them. "We demolished thirty churches and built temples. There was some commotion."

Forcible conversion of Christians
Human Rights Watch reported that Aseemanand played a huge role in the 1998 attacks on Christians in southeastern Gujarat, where dozens of churches were burnt down or damaged. The Human rights watch also credited him with the "Unai hot springs conversion ritual" whereby Christian tribals in the district were taken to Asheemanand's ashram and then to the hot springs in Unai, where they were made to forcibly convert to Hinduism. The fieldwork of this conversion ritual was mostly done by the Hindu Jagran Manch. The tribals were animists before their conversion to Christianity. During an interview he claimed to have converted more than 40,000 people to Hinduism and demolished 30 churches in Dang district.

The RSS mouthpiece  Organiser described him as "hero of the Dangs".

Allegations, arrest and acquittal
Rajasthan's anti-terrorist squad (ATS) arrested Devendra Gupta on 29 April in connection with 2007 Ajmer Dargah bombing. During the course of his interrogation, Gupta allegedly mentioned that it was Aseemanand and Sunil Joshi who had brought him into their fold and persuaded him to carry out the attacks on Ajmer Sharif and Mecca Masjid.  Rajasthan ATS was led to track Aseemanand and he was arrested by the Central Bureau of Investigation (CBI) on 19 November 2010 from an ashram in Haridwar in Uttarakhand for his alleged involvement in the Ajmer Sharief, Mecca Masjid and Samjhauta Express blasts. He was charged in June 2011 by NIA for planning the blast. He was conditionally granted bail in 2015 in the blast case. After a prolonged trial Swami Assemanand was acquitted in Ajmer dargah and Mecca Masjid blast cases by NIA Special Courts in March 2017 and April 2018.

On 20 March 2019, a NIA Special court acquitted all four accused including Swami Aseemanand in Samjhauta Express Blast case. "The NIA Special Court has concluded that the investigating agency has failed to prove the conspiracy charge and ruled that accused deserve a benefit of doubt", NIA Counsel RK Handa said.

References

People from Hooghly district
Rashtriya Swayamsevak Sangh pracharaks
University of Burdwan alumni
Living people
Year of birth missing (living people)
Terrorism in India
Indian people imprisoned on charges of terrorism
Hindu nationalists
2007 Samjhauta Express bombings
21st-century Bengalis
Hinduism-motivated violence in India